Colobostruma is a genus of ants in the subfamily Myrmicinae. All except one species are restricted to Australia. The only non-Australian species, C. foliacea, is found in New Guinea and the Solomon Islands.

Species
Colobostruma alinodis (Forel, 1913)
Colobostruma australis Brown, 1959
Colobostruma biconcava Shattuck, 2000
Colobostruma biconvexa Shattuck, 2000
Colobostruma bicorna Shattuck, 2000
Colobostruma cerornata Brown, 1959
Colobostruma elliotti (Clark, 1928)
Colobostruma foliacea (Emery, 1897)
Colobostruma froggatti (Forel, 1913)
Colobostruma lacuna Shattuck, 2000
Colobostruma leae (Wheeler, 1927)
Colobostruma mellea Shattuck, 2000
Colobostruma nancyae Brown, 1965
Colobostruma papulata Brown, 1965
Colobostruma sisypha Shattuck, 2000
Colobostruma unicorna Shattuck, 2000

References

External links

Myrmicinae
Ant genera
Hymenoptera of Australia